One Love – One Dream is the fifth studio album by American singer Jeffrey Osborne. It was released by A&M Records on July 15, 1988. The album reached number 12 on the US Billboard Top R&B/Hip-Hop Albums chart.

Critical reception
The Los Angeles Times deemed the album "pop-oriented material that's better than the featherweight fare that, say, Rick Astley records, but that still underutilizes Osborne's abilities." The Christian Science Monitor thought that "as in the past, the ballads here are the strongest material, especially 'Family' and 'My Heart Can Wait Forever'." People called the album "disappointing," writing that it's "rife with paltry pop like the title track ... failed funk like 'She's on the Left', and frilly would-be show tunes like 'True Believers'."

Track listing

Notes
"Social Climbers" appears on the CD version of One Love – One Dream only.

Personnel 
Performers and Musicians

 Jeffrey Osborne – lead and backing vocals, arrangements (1, 2, 4, 6-10), keyboards (6), horn arrangements (6, 9), drum programming (10)
 David "Hawk" Wolinski – keyboards (1), LinnDrum (1), arrangements (1)
 Robert Brookins – keyboards (2, 3, 9), synth bass (2, 9), drum machine programming (2), LinnDrum programming (3), arrangements (3)
 Ed Grenga – keyboards (4), synthesizer programming (4), arrangements (4)
 Bobby Lyle – keyboards (5, 7, 8, 10)
 Philip Woo – keyboards (5, 10)
 Khaliq Glover – synthesizer programming (6, 10)
 Andy Goldmark – keyboards (7, 11), programming (7, 11)
 Bruce Roberts – keyboards (7, 11), programming (7, 11)
 Randy Kerber – synth strings (7)
 Franne Golde – keyboards (11), programming (11), backing vocals (11)
 Paul Jackson Jr. – guitar (1, 5, 6, 7, 10, 11)
 Maitland Ward – guitar (4)
 Michael Landau – guitar (6, 8)
 Freddie Washington – bass (4, 7, 8, 10), arrangements (10)
 Abraham Laboriel – bass (5, 6)
 Freddy Lawson – bass (9)
 Ricky Lawson – drums (4, 6, 8, 9, 10)
 John Robinson – drums (5)
 Paulinho da Costa – percussion (4-7, 9)
 Donny Osborne – bongos (9)
 Gerald Albright – saxophone (2)
 Dan Higgins – saxophone (6, 9)
 Kirk Whalum – tenor saxophone (6, 9)
 Bill Reichenbach Jr. – trombone (6, 9)
 Gary Grant – trumpet (6, 9)
 Jerry Hey – trumpet (6, 9), horn arrangements (9)
 Ross Vannelli – arrangements (4, 8)
 Lynn Davis – backing vocals (1, 2, 3, 6, 7, 9, 10, 11)
 Joey Diggs – backing vocals (1-4, 6-11)
 Portia Griffin – backing vocals (1-5, 8, 9, 11)
 Natalie Jackson – backing vocals (1, 2)
 Alex Brown – backing vocals (3, 6, 7, 10, 11)
 Johnny Gill – backing vocals (4, 8, 9)
 Marva Barnes – backing vocals (4-11)
 Marcy Levy – backing vocals (5)
 Keith John – backing vocals (6, 7, 8)

Strings (Tracks 2, 5, 8 & 10)

 George Del Barrio – arrangements and conductor (2, 8)
 Jeremy Lubbock – arrangements and conductor (5, 10)
 Ronald Cooper, Larry Corbett, Ernie Ehrhardt, Suzie Katayama, Ron Leonard and David Speltz – cello
 Marylin Baker, Kenneth Burward-Hoy, Alan DeVeritch and Pamela Goldsmith – viola 
 Ron Clark, Isabelle Daskoff, Ronald Folsom, Joseph Goodman, Bill Hybel, William Hymanson, Peter Kent, Brian Leonard, Gordon Marron, Stanley Plummer, Debra Price, Jay Rosen, Marshall Sosson and Shari Zippert – violin

Production and Technical

 Jeffrey Osborne – producer 
 David Wolinski – producer (1)
 Robert Brookins – producer (2, 3)
 Ross Vannelli – producer (4, 8)
 Bruce Roberts – producer (5, 7, 11)
 Andy Goldmark – producer (7, 11)
 Freddie Washington – producer (10)
 Donny Osborne – production assistant 
 Khaliq Glover – recording 
 Tommy Vicari – recording, mixing 
 Taavi Mote – mixing 
 Bryant Arnett – assistant engineer 
 Brian Gardner – mastering
 Sherri Yvette Osborne – production coordinator  
 Chuck Beeson – art direction 
 Melanie Nielsen – design 
 Victoria Pearson – photography 
 Jack Nelson – management

Charts

Weekly charts

Year-end charts

References

1988 albums
Jeffrey Osborne albums
A&M Records albums